Nunavut is one of Canada's territories, and has established several territorial symbols.

Symbols of Nunavut

 "Qimmiq" or "qimmik" is the Inuit language word for "dog"

Great Seal

Like Yukon, Nunavut does not have an official Great Seal.

References

Nunavut symbols
Nunavut
 
Indigenous peoples in Canada-related lists
Nunavut
Symbols